Beladiyeh (also Romanized as Belādīyeh; also known as Shahrak-e Belādīyeh) is a village in Choghamish Rural District, Choghamish District, Dezful County, Khuzestan Province, Iran. At the 2006 census, its population was 813, in 182 families.

References 

Populated places in Dezful County